Rabiya Occeña Mateo (born November 14, 1996) is a Filipino model, host, actress, entrepreneur and beauty queen who was crowned Miss Universe Philippines 2020. She represented the Philippines at the Miss Universe 2020 pageant and finished as a top 21 semifinalist.

Early life and education
Rabiya Occeña Mateo was born out of a domestic partnership between her Indian-American father and her Filipina mother who later on separated. According to Mateo, she grew up in poverty. She attended the Bachelor of Science in Physical Therapy Program at the Iloilo Doctors' College and graduated cum laude. , Mateo works at a review center in Manila as a lecturer and review coordinator.

Career

Pagentry

Miss Universe Philippines 2020 
She represented Iloilo City at the Miss Universe Philippines 2020 pageant after she won Miss Iloilo Universe 2020 at West Visayas State University Cultural Center. 

During the question and answer round of the Top 16 semifinalists, she was asked: "Throughout this journey you have discovered you are a phenomenal woman who is conditioned for greater. How can you create a positive and lasting impact to the world around you?" She responded:
"First of all, I need to stick to my core, which is being passionate about educating people. I am a lecturer and I've been pursuing this because this education had helped me to have that comfortable life that I and my family deserves and I wanna push people, I want them to achieve greater things in life through me and I know that Miss Universe anything is possible because I am a phenomenal woman with a heartfelt beauty."

During the first question and answer portion of the Top 5 finalists, she was asked: "If you can create a new paper currency with the image of any Filipino on it, dead or alive, who would it be and why?" She responded:
"If I were given the chance, I want to use the face of Miriam Defensor-Santiago. For those who don’t know, she was an Ilongga. But what I admired about her is that she used her knowledge, her voice to serve the country. I want to be somebody like her - somebody who puts her heart, her passion into action. After all, she is the best President that we never had."

During the second question and answer portion of the Top 5 finalists, she was asked: "This pandemic has made clear our priorities, essential or non-essential. Where do pageants stand in this time of crisis?" She responded:
"As a candidate, I know I am not just a face of Iloilo City but I am here carrying hope and as a symbol of light in the darkest of times. As of the moment, I want to help my community. I want to use my strength to make an impact. And that is the essence of beauty pageant. It gives us the power to make a difference."

At the end of the event, Mateo was crowned by the outgoing Miss Universe Philippines, Gazini Ganados, as Miss Universe Philippines 2020, along with the Best in Swimsuit award.

On September 30, 2021, Mateo crowned Beatrice Gomez as her successor at the Miss Universe Philippines 2021 pageant, which was held at the Henann Resort Convention Center, Alona Beach, in Panglao, Bohol, Philippines.

Miss Universe 2020 
Mateo represented the Philippines at the Miss Universe 2020 pageant in Miami, Florida, United States.

At the national costume competition, Mateo wore an ensemble made by the late avant-garde designer Rocky Gathercole. It featured blue and red wings and 3 gold stars that was inspired by the Philippine flag. The whole ensemble weighed more than 21 kilos. It was supposed to be complete with an extravagant headpiece by veteran jeweler Manny Halasan that symbolized the Philippine flag’s sun, but she was not able to wear it because it was too big on her head and kept falling off. Moreover, the long train of her outfit proved too heavy for her to carry paired with her huge feathered wings, leading her team to make the last-minute decision to set the train aside since the chances of her falling if she went off balance in her seven-inch heels would be dangerous. It caused Mateo to spend her preparation time cutting the train and running for pins and scissors, and it did not leave her enough time to retouch her hair and her makeup, resulting in a performance many commentators reviewed as underwhelming. Just after the show, she filmed an Instagram live video to apologize to the people who were disappointed, during which she broke down crying.

At the preliminary competition, Mateo showed her 'hala-bira' walk. She donned a yellow two-piece bikini with an ankle-length coverup made of sheer fabric at the preliminary swimsuit competition. She wore an evening gown designed by Philippine-born, Dubai-based Furne One of Amato Couture at the preliminary evening gown competition. It is a yellow long gown paired with what appeared to be sun-inspired earrings which represents the sun, which symbolizes happiness, strength & vitality. The masterpiece featured a cape with citrine Swarovski crystals.

At the coronation night, Mateo walked in a yellow two-piece swimsuit by Eva Sevahl at the Top 21 swimsuit competition.

Mateo concluded her Miss Universe journey by finishing as a Top 21 semifinalist. Andrea Meza of Mexico won the said pageant.

Post-Miss Universe Philippines; Acting and hosting duties
On September 30, 2021, Mateo crowned Beatrice Luigi Gomez of Cebu City as her successor at the end of the Miss Universe Philippines 2021 pageant. A few minutes before, Mateo unintentionally garnered the attention of the media because she tripped on the hem of her long thigh-slit gown and fell during her final walk. Many newspapers and commentators pointed out the fact that Mateo fell during her very last walk as Miss Universe Philippines 2020, while just three days afterwards Tracy Maureen Perez also fell when she was doing her very first walk as Miss World Philippines 2021.

Mateo made her acting debut in Ngisngis, an installment of Kapuso Mo, Jessica Soho's horror special Gabi ng Lagim. She later signed a contract with GMA Network on November 18, 2021, becoming one of the artists managed by GMA Artist Center (now Sparkle).

In 2022, Mateo was paired with Bong Revilla in the second season of Agimat ng Agila. The same year, she began hosting in the opening ceremony of NCAA Season 97. Mateo is currently serving as one of the main hosts of daily variety game show TiktoClock, along with Pokwang and Kim Atienza.

Filmography

Television

Web

References

External links

https://www.gmanetwork.com/sparkle/artists/rabiyamateo

1996 births
Living people
People from Iloilo
Filipino people of American descent
Filipino people of Indian descent
Hiligaynon people
Miss Universe 2020 contestants
Miss Universe Philippines winners
Filipino female models
GMA Network personalities
GMA Integrated News and Public Affairs people
Filipino television personalities
21st-century Filipino actresses
Filipino television actresses
Filipino women television presenters
Filipino television variety show hosts